Jake Kelchner (born June 27, 1970) is a former starting quarterback for West Virginia University during the 1990s.  He was part of the mountaineers undefeated 1993 team.  Kelchner also went on to play one season in the Canadian Football League (CFL) and three seasons in the Arena Football League (AFL).

College career
Kelchner started his college career at the University of Notre Dame.  Notre Dame had also signed Rick Mirer of Goshen, Indiana, the No. 1 prospect in the country.  Two years later Kelchner transferred to West Virginia.

Professional career
In 1994, he played 1 game with the Las Vegas Posse of the Canadian Football League. Additionally, Kelchner played with the Tampa Bay Storm, Florida Bobcats and Grand Rapids Rampage for 3 seasons over 4 years.

Personal life
Jake Kelchner married Morgantown native Kimberly Knouse in 2002.  They have two children. He now resides in Ravenna, Ohio.

References

1970 births
Living people
People from Berwick, Pennsylvania
Players of American football from Pennsylvania
American football quarterbacks
Notre Dame Fighting Irish football players
West Virginia Mountaineers football players
Las Vegas Posse players
Tampa Bay Storm players
Florida Bobcats players
Grand Rapids Rampage players